Taylor Curran (born 7 July 2000) is an English professional footballer who plays as a defender for National League South club Welling United.

Career
Curran began his career with Southend United, signing a 2-year professional contract in March 2018. In November 2018 he joined National League side Braintree Town on loan, making 2 appearances for the club in all competitions.

He signed for Swindon Town in January 2019, on a -year contract. He made his debut for Swindon on 4 May 2019.

On 9 July 2021, Curran joined National League South side Maidstone United.

In 2022, Curran spent time on loan at Haringey Borough and then Welling United.

Having spent the end of the season with the club on loan, Curran returned permanently to Welling United in July 2022.

Career statistics

Honours
Swindon Town
EFL League Two: 2019–20

References

2000 births
Living people
English footballers
Association football defenders
Southend United F.C. players
Braintree Town F.C. players
Swindon Town F.C. players
Maidstone United F.C. players
Haringey Borough F.C. players
Welling United F.C. players
English Football League players
National League (English football) players
Isthmian League players
Footballers from the London Borough of Redbridge